Jeff Szusterman (born March 6, 1966) is a New Zealand voice, film and television actor known for playing Master Xandred on Power Rangers Samurai.

He graduated from Toi Whakaari: New Zealand Drama School in 1995 with a Diploma in Acting.

Along with his wife, actress Jacque Drew, Szusterman runs a theatre company called "Still Water Rising". Among the plays he's directed are My First Time at the Fortune Theatre in Dunedin, Mojo, and A History of the American Film.  At the 25th annual Drammy Awards in 2001, Szusterman won 'Best Actor in a Lead Role' for his work in Not About Heroes?.

Szusterman is on the board of the perfomers union Equity New Zealand.

Filmography
 Return to Treasure Island (1996) as Jacob 
 The Shirt  (2000) as Nick 
 Hercules (2005) as Silenus
 Doves of War (1 episode, 2006) as Michael Kadir
 Paradise at the End of the World (2009) as Jeffrey Trench 
 The Cult (1 episode, 2009) as Doctor
 The Jaquie Brown Diaries (5 episodes, 2009) as Randall
 Legend of the Seeker (2 episodes, 2009-2010) as Captain Frannick
 Power Rangers Samurai (19 episodes 2011) as Master Xandred (voice) and Octoroo (voice)
 Power Rangers Super Samurai (22 episodes 2012) as Master Xandred (voice) and Octoroo (voice)
 Power Rangers Dino Charge (1 episode 2015) as Scrapper (voice)
 Power Rangers Dino Super Charge (2 episodes 2016) as City Worker

References

External links
 

Power Rangers Samurai
Living people
New Zealand male stage actors
New Zealand male television actors
New Zealand male voice actors
1966 births
Toi Whakaari alumni